Jordan Ahli Bank (previously Jordan National Bank ) is a Jordanian institution founded in 1955, headquartered in Amman. It has operations in  Lebanon, Palestine, and Cyprus. Ahli Bank was the sixth public shareholding company to be established in Jordan. In 2018, 12-13% of the bank's portfolio was represented by lending to SMEs.

References

External links

 Jordan Ahli Bank
 

1955 establishments in Jordan
Banks established in 1955
Banks of Jordan
Companies based in Amman
Companies listed on the Amman Stock Exchange